Joaquín Larraín Gandarillas (October 13, 1822 - September 26, 1897) was a Chilean priest, Roman Catholic bishop of Santiago, professor, writer and first president of the Pontifical Catholic University of Chile.

Early life
He was born in Santiago, Chile, the sixth of 15 children of Juan Francisco Larraín Rojas and of Mercedes Gandarillas Aránguiz. He studied at the prestigious Instituto Nacional, in Santiago and from there he went to the Santiago Seminary. In 1844 he graduated in Theology and Law. After a long discernment, he decided to embrace the ecclesiastical career. Before entering the priesthood, the young Joaquín had written several impassioned articles dealing with apologetics and other religious subjects, in catholic magazines. Larraín Gandarillas was of Basque descent.

Priesthood
After having fulfilled all the necessary stages, he was ordained as a priest and celebrated his first mass in the Church of the company (Santiago) on April 4, 1847. His priesthood and subsequent episcopate were characterized by the untiring energy and initiative that he applied on all his missions and in the exercise of his ministry.

He lived in the U.S. for some time, where he took part in the Plenary Council of North America as a delegate of the bishop of Richmond. In 1853 he was appointed Rector of the Santiago Seminary. One year earlier, Larraín Gandarillas had become a member of the Faculty of Theology of the University of Chile. In 1877 he was appointed auxiliary bishop of the Santiago archdiocese. He was the first president ("rector") of the Pontifical Catholic University of Chile, which was founded June 21, 1888 through a decree issued by the Santiago Archbishopric.

Other assignments
In 1864 Larraín Gandarillas was elected as a member of parliament (diputado) for the (now extinct) electoral district of Rere, near Concepción. During his parliamentary tenure he was vocal in manifesting his strong religious convictions. He left parliament, in 1867.

Monsignor Joaquín Larraín Gandarillas died in Santiago in 1897, at the age of 75.

Summary of ecclesiastical life

References

External links
Bio at Catholic hierarchy  
Short biographical sketch  

1822 births
1897 deaths
People from Santiago
Chilean people of Basque descent
19th-century Roman Catholic bishops in Chile
Joaquin
Roman Catholic bishops of Santiago de Chile